Washington César Santos (January 3, 1960 – May 25, 2014) was a Brazilian footballer who played as a striker. He was born in Valença, Bahia State, and died in Curitiba.

In his career (1980–1996) he played for several clubs: Galícia (1980 and 1995), Corinthians, Operário and Internacional (1981) Atlético Paranaense (1982–1983 and 1992), Fluminense (1983–1989, eighth best top goalscorer in club history with 118 goals in 311 matches), Guarani (1989–1990), Botafogo (1990–1991) União São João (1991–1992) Desportiva-ES (1992) Santa Cruz (1993–1994) Figueiras (1994), Fortaleza (1996) and Foz de Iguaçu (1996).

He won one Rio Grande do Sul State Tournament (1981), one Paraná State Tournament (1982), four Campeonato Carioca (1983, 1984, 1985, 1990), and one Campeonato Brasileiro Série A (1984),

With the Brazil national football team he got 5 international caps and won the 1987 Pan American Games.

On 25 May 2014 Washington died due to amyotrophic lateral sclerosis.

References

External links
 

1960 births
2014 deaths
Brazilian footballers
Brazil international footballers
Association football forwards
Campeonato Brasileiro Série A players
Sport Club Corinthians Paulista players
Sport Club Internacional players
Club Athletico Paranaense players
Fluminense FC players
Botafogo de Futebol e Regatas players
Guarani FC players
União São João Esporte Clube players
Santa Cruz Futebol Clube players
Fortaleza Esporte Clube players
Neurological disease deaths in Paraná (state)
Deaths from motor neuron disease
Sportspeople from Bahia
Pan American Games gold medalists for Brazil
Pan American Games medalists in football
Footballers at the 1987 Pan American Games
Medalists at the 1987 Pan American Games